The 2007 China League One was the fourth season of the China League One, the second tier of the Chinese football league pyramid, since its establishment in 2004.

Teams 
A total of 13 teams contested in the league, including 10 sides from the 2006 season, one relegated from the 2006 Chinese Super League and two promoted from the 2006 China League Two.

Team changes

To League One 

Teams relegated from 2006 Chinese Super League
 Chongqing Lifan

Teams promoted from 2006 China League Two
 Beijing BIT
 Harbin Yiteng

From League One 
Teams promoted to 2007 Chinese Super League
 Henan Construction
 Zhejiang Greentown

Teams relegated to 2007 China League Two
 Hunan Shoking

League table

External links
2007 China League One

China League One seasons
2
China
China